Simone Benedetti (born 3 April 1992) is an Italian professional footballer who plays as a centre back for  club Avellino.

He is the son of former Italian football player, Silvano Benedetti.

Club career

Torino
He grew up from an early age in the Torino youth system and played for all the youth teams up to the Primavera in 2008, under the guidance of Antonino Asta. After collecting an appearance on the bench in Serie A on 16 January 2008 in a match away against Roma, he made his debut among the professionals ranks in the last round of the 2009–10 season, playing as a starter against Cittadella, won 1–0. The team reached the playoffs, but lost in the final with Brescia, but except for an appearance on the bench against Sassuolo, he was only a spectator.

Internazionale
On 22 July 2010 he was sold to F.C. Internazionale Milano in co-ownership deal for €2 million in 5-year contract, co-currently Alen Stevanović joined the opposite direction also in co-ownership deal for €2M. Due to the injury crisis, he also selected to 2010 FIFA Club World Cup but did not play. With Inter's Primavera under-20 team, he won 2011 Torneo di Viareggio.

On 13 July 2011 he left for Serie B newcomer Gubbio on loan. He was one of the starting centre-back of the team, in either 3–5–2 or 4–4–2 formation.

In June 2012 the co-ownership between Torino and Inter was renewed. As Torino was promoted to Serie A, Benedetti continued his Serie B career with Spezia Calcio. In June 2013 Benedetti joined Inter outright; Stevanović also joined Turin in the same formula. On 20 July 2013 he was signed by another Serie B club Calcio Padova.

Cagliari and loan
On 7 July 2014 he was purchased by Cagliari, coached by Zdenek Zeman, for €1 million. On 19 October 2014 he made his debut in Serie A at home to Sampdoria.

After only five appearances he was loaned to Bari in Serie B, making his first appearance for the Galletti on 3 March 2015 against Catania.

Entella
On 26 January 2016 he was signed by Virtus Entella, in a temporary deal as well as a pre-set price. On 1 July Entella excised the option to sign Benedetti outright.

Pisa
On 16 January 2019, he joined Pisa.

Alessandria
On 3 August 2021, he signed a two-year contract with Alessandria.

Feralpisalò
On 23 August 2022, Benedetti moved to Feralpisalò on a two-year deal.

Avellino
On 20 January 2023, Benedetti joined Avellino.

International career
Benedetti started his youth international career in a born 1992/1993 training camp., he then received first call-up for 2007 under-16 international Val-de-Marne tournament. He played the first two match of 2009 U-17 Euro qualifying, which Italy was the group runner-up. In the elite round he played all 3 games and Italy was the group winner. Despite named as the captain, he did not play the first match of the final round and only made a substitute appearance in the second match, for Vincenzo Camilleri. Benedetti returned to the starting XI and partnered with Alessio Campoli (due to the injury of Camilleri) in the third group stage match and the semi-final, losing to Germany. Despite finished fourth, Azzurrini still qualified for 2009 FIFA U-17 World Cup. In the World Junior Cup, Michele Camporese and Camilleri became the new starting centre-backs and Benedetti only played the third group stage match and the round of 16 as sub. He only started the last match, the quarter-finals due to the suspension of Federico Mannini (who succeed Camilleri as starter), losing to Switzerland, which also the Euro losing semi-finalists.

In 2011 U-19 Euro qualifying, Benedetti started twice (partnered with Camporese) and also played twice in the elite round as captain (partnered with Paolo Rozzio), only replaced by Camporese in the last match. Italy finished as the runner-up, failed to qualify to the next stage by losing to the Group winner Republic of Ireland.

In 2011–12 member he was selected as a member of U-20 team for 2011–12 Four Nations Tournament. He played three times, against Switzerland twice and Germany once. He also played another friendlies against Ghana, Macedonia and Denmark.

Honours

Club
Internazionale (U19)
 Torneo di Viareggio: 2011

References

External links
 
 FIGC 

1992 births
Footballers from Turin
Living people
Italian footballers
Italy youth international footballers
Association football central defenders
Serie A players
Serie B players
Serie C players
Torino F.C. players
Inter Milan players
A.S. Gubbio 1910 players
Spezia Calcio players
Calcio Padova players
Cagliari Calcio players
S.S.C. Bari players
Virtus Entella players
Pisa S.C. players
U.S. Alessandria Calcio 1912 players
FeralpiSalò players
U.S. Avellino 1912 players